Sergey Vladimirovich Ivanov (born 26 October 1969) is a Russian politician,  who was a member of the State Duma from 2003 to 2021.

He opposed some of the 2020 amendments to the constitution that were proposed by President Vladimir Putin.

Biography 
Ivanov was born in Tomsk and graduated from the Tomsk State University in 1992, majoring in history.

Ivanov was coordinator of the Kursk regional branch of the LDPR. He has also been assistant deputy of the State Duma. He was elected a deputy of the 4th convocation of the State Duma, the lower house of the Federal Assembly of Russia, and has been re-elected three times.

7th convocation of the State Duma
In 2016, Ivanov was re-elected as a deputy in the State Duma, and his first day in office was 18 September 2016. He was a representative for Rostov Oblast. He was a member of the counting commission of the State Duma, a member of the State Duma Committee on Parliamentary Ethics, and a member of the State Duma Committee on Legislation and State Building.

He spoke out against an 2020 amendment to the constitution that granted the President immunity after leaving office.

References 

Living people
21st-century Russian politicians
Liberal Democratic Party of Russia politicians
Tomsk State University alumni
1969 births
Fourth convocation members of the State Duma (Russian Federation)
Fifth convocation members of the State Duma (Russian Federation)
Sixth convocation members of the State Duma (Russian Federation)
Seventh convocation members of the State Duma (Russian Federation)